The Absent-Minded Waiter is a 1977 American comedy short film starring Steve Martin, Buck Henry and Teri Garr. It was written by Martin and directed by Carl Gottlieb. The film was produced by William E. McEuen, who would go on to produce Steve Martin's next six films.

The short was screened as part of "The Best of the Shorts" program at Filmex on March 26, 1977 and was also shown at Martin's stand-up shows before he went on. It was nominated for the Academy Award for Best Live Action Short Film at the 1977 Academy Awards.

Plot
A couple (Henry and Garr) have gone out to dinner at a fancy restaurant the husband claims has the world's most absent-minded waiter. Martin plays a poor waiter. He has many mishaps, including pouring water before placing down the glasses, forcing the couple to repeat their order of "two martinis" three times, and subsequently bringing them six martinis. The film culminates with the wife becoming angry that she got dressed up, hired a babysitter and then was brought out to a restaurant with such amazingly bad service. The husband pleads with her: "Trust me... trust me." Immediately afterwards, the waiter returns with their "change"—$10,000 worth—before the couple had even paid. As they gleefully get up from their chairs to leave, the waiter comes back to ask, "Two for dinner?" to which the wife quickly responds, "Yes, two please," and the couple then sits right back down at their table.

Cast
Steve Martin as Steven, the Waiter
Buck Henry as Bernie Cates
Teri Garr as Susan Cates
Ivor Barry as Carl, the Maitre D'
Naomi Stevens as Naomi, the Cashier

Home media
The short was included on the 1993 VHS release of the special Steve Martin Live and on the 2012 DVD box set Steve Martin: The Television Stuff.

References

External links

Excerpt on YouTube
The Absent-Minded Waiter on MUBI

1977 short films
1977 films
1977 comedy films
American comedy short films
Fictional waiting staff
Films scored by Marvin Hamlisch
Films directed by Carl Gottlieb
Films with screenplays by Steve Martin
Paramount Pictures short films
1970s English-language films
1970s American films